Alfred Herbert Wood (23 April 1866 – 19 April 1941) was an English first-class cricketer.

Wood made a single first-class appearance for Hampshire against Somerset in the 1901 County Championship.

Wood died at Southsea, Hampshire on 19 April 1941.

Wood was Sir Arthur Conan Doyle's secretary from the early 1900s until his retirement in 1930.

External links
Alfred Wood at Cricinfo
Alfred Wood at CricketArchive

1866 births
1941 deaths
Cricketers from Portsmouth
English cricketers
Hampshire cricketers